Nathan Smith  is an American professional ice hockey center currently playing for the Tucson Roadrunners in the American Hockey League (AHL) while under contract to the Arizona Coyotes of the National Hockey League (NHL). He was a member of United States national team at the 2022 Winter Olympics.

Playing career
Growing up in Florida, Smith initially played roller hockey before switching to ice hockey when he was 10 with the Tampa Scorpions youth program. He was a high-scoring forward in junior hockey, leading the Cedar Rapids RoughRiders for two consecutive years. Despite being taken by the Winnipeg Jets in the 2018 NHL Draft, he remained in juniors for another year before beginning his college career. He debuted for Minnesota State in 2019 and provided second-line scoring for a team that was ranked #1 for a time during the season. Minnesota State entered the postseason as one of the favorites to contend for a national title. However, the COVID-19 pandemic caused the Mavericks' season to end abruptly.

After the end of his freshman year was canceled, Smith's sophomore season was delayed by over a month. Despite the upheaval, Smith put up good numbers and finished second on the team in scoring. In the Mavericks' first game of the NCAA Tournament; they found themselves down 1–3 with under 10 minutes to play. Smith scored to cut the lead in half, which began a tremendous comeback by MSU that led to the program's first tournament win at the Division I level. After scoring a goal in Minnesota State's 4–0 win over Minnesota, he added two more on the power play against St. Cloud State in the national semifinal. While it wasn't enough to get the Mavericks a win, it did earn him a spot on the All-Tournament Team.

At the start of his junior season in 2021–22, Smith began scoring in bunches. By the end of December, he was leading the nation in scoring. He would finish the season, placing second in league-wide scoring having registered 19 goals and 50 points in 38 games with Minnesota State. He helped the Mavericks reach the Frozen Four championship game against the University of Denver and was a Hobey Baker top 10 finalist.

On March 21, 2022, Smith's NHL rights were traded by the Jets, along with the contract of Bryan Little, to the Arizona Coyotes in exchange for a 2022 fourth-round draft pick. At the conclusion of his junior season, Smith was immediately signed by the Coyotes to a two-year, entry-level contract on April 11, 2022. One day later on April 12, 2022, Smith made his NHL debut against the New Jersey Devils.

International play
In the midst of a standout junior collegiate season, Smith was as a prime target for the United States national team when the NHL announced that it would not be sending its players to Beijing for the Winter Olympics. Less than a month later, Smith was named to the team. In a fifth-place finish with Team USA, Smith contributed 1 goal and 2 points through 4 games.

Career statistics

Regular season and playoffs

International

Awards and honors

References

External links

1998 births
Living people
AHCA Division I men's ice hockey All-Americans
American men's ice hockey centers
Arizona Coyotes players
Cedar Rapids RoughRiders players
Ice hockey people from Florida
Sportspeople from Tampa, Florida
Minnesota State Mavericks men's ice hockey players
Ice hockey players at the 2022 Winter Olympics
Olympic ice hockey players of the United States
Tucson Roadrunners players
Winnipeg Jets draft picks
Minnesota State University, Mankato alumni